The Waitemata County was one of the counties of New Zealand in the North Island. Established in 1876, the county covered West Auckland, Rodney and the North Shore. The county shrunk in size between 1886 and 1954 when various urban areas on the North Shore and in West Auckland became boroughs and established their own local councils. The Waitemata County was replaced by the Waitemata City in 1974.

History 

The county was established in 1876, after the abolition of the Auckland Province, and was one of the largest counties created in New Zealand. The county replaced the only previous local government system, which was a series of local road boards which were established from 1862 onwards. The county was split into six ridings: Ararimu, Manukau, Takapuna, Titirangi, Waitakerei and Weiti.

In 1881, the Town District Act allowed communities of more than 50 households to amalgamate into a town district. Large town districts were able to form boroughs, which had their own councils and a greater lending power. Between 1886 and 1954, nine boroughs split from the county as the North Shore and West Auckland began to develop: Devonport in 1886, Birkenhead in 1888, Northcote in 1908, Takapuna, 1913, New Lynn in 1929, Henderson in 1946, Helensville in 1947, Glen Eden in 1953 and East Coast Bays in 1954. The remaining county area retained a primarily rural atmosphere until the 1950s. In 1953, Herald Island (then known as Pine Island) joined the Waitemata County, previously having no local government.

For most of its existence, the Waitemata County was known for being undeveloped and inaccessible. In the early 1960s, the Auckland Regional Planning Authority began looking for ways to better develop the county. A 1962 commission recommended replacing the county with a ward-based city in West Auckland, however after six years of appeals, this idea was scrapped.

On 1 August 1974, Waitemata City formed from the Titirangi, Te Atatū, Lincoln and Waitākere ridings. The boroughs of New Lynn, Henderson and Glen Eden each decided not to join the new city. The remaining ridings were split between different authorities: Kumeu Riding became a part of Rodney County, while Glenfield and Albany joined the North Shore City.

See also 
 List of former territorial authorities in New Zealand § Counties

References

Bibliography

Counties of New Zealand
Politics of the Auckland Region
1876 establishments in New Zealand
1974 disestablishments in New Zealand
Former subdivisions of the Auckland Region